Sangab may refer to:
 Sangab, Razavi Khorasan
 Sangab, Semnan
 Sangab, South Khorasan